Hilman Hariwijaya (25 August 1964 – 9 March 2022) was an Indonesian writer, better known for a short story entitled Lupus in Hai magazine in December 1986, which was later published into a novel. Hariwijaya died in Jakarta on 9 March 2022, at the age of 57.

Works

Books
 Lupus
 Lupus ABG
 Lupus Kecil
 Olga
 Lulu
 Vanya
 Vladd

Screenwriter

Films

 Dealova (2005)
 The Wall (2007)
 Anak Ajaib (2008)
 Suka Ma Suka (2009)
 Rasa (2009)

TV series

 Cinta Fitri
 Separuh Aku (2012)
 Cinta 7 Susun (2013)
 Anak Jalanan (2015–17)
 Anak Langit (2017-2020)
 Boy (2017)
 Anak Band (2020-2021)
 Love Story the series (2021-2022)
 Badai Pasti Berlalu (2021)

References

External links
 
 Hilman, Obrolan tentang Lupus Sampai Raditya Dika

1964 births
2022 deaths
20th-century male writers
20th-century novelists
Indonesian male novelists
Indonesian male writers
People from Jakarta
Indonesian screenwriters
Male screenwriters
21st-century screenwriters
21st-century male writers
20th-century Indonesian writers
21st-century Indonesian writers